The men's shot put event at the 2008 Olympic Games took place on 15 August at the Beijing Olympic Stadium. Forty-four athletes from 34 nations competed. The event was won by Tomasz Majewski of Poland, the nation's first victory (and first medal) in the men's shot put since 1972. Christian Cantwell of the United States took silver, the seventh consecutive Games in which an American finished first or second.

Andrei Mikhnevich of Belarus was initially awarded the bronze medal but he was later disqualified for doping and the medal was awarded to 4th-place finisher Dylan Armstrong of Canada. It was Canada's first men's shot put medal.

Background

This was the 26th appearance of the event, which is one of 12 athletics events to have been held at every Summer Olympics. The top eight finishers from 2004 returned: Yuriy Bilonoh of Ukraine (whose 2004 gold medal would later be stripped), Adam Nelson of the United States, Joachim Olsen of Denmark, Manuel Martínez Gutiérrez of Spain, Andrei Mikhnevich and Yury Bialou of Belarus, Justin Anlezark of Australia, and Ralf Bartels of Germany, along with eleventh-place finisher Miran Vodovnik of Slovenia. Nelson had won the 2005 world championships and come in second to Reese Hoffa in 2007. Hoffa, Nelson, and Christian Cantwell were favored, with an American sweep thought to be a "real possibility."

Chinese Taipei, Iran, Jamaica, Portugal, and Serbia each made their debut in the men's shot put. The United States made its 25th appearance, most of any nation, having missed only the boycotted 1980 Games.

Qualification

The qualifying standards were 20.30 m (66.6 ft) (A standard) and 19.80 m (64.96 ft) (B standard). Each National Olympic Committee (NOC) was able to enter up to three entrants providing they had met the A qualifying standard in the qualifying period (1 January 2007 to 23 July 2008). NOCs were also permitted to enter one athlete providing he had met the B standard in the same qualifying period. The maximum number of athletes per nation had been set at 3 since the 1930 Olympic Congress.

Competition format

The competition used the two-round format introduced in 1936, with the qualifying round completely separate from the divided final. In qualifying, each athlete received three attempts; those recording a mark of at least 20.40 metres advanced to the final. If fewer than 12 athletes achieved that distance, the top 12 would advance. The results of the qualifying round were then ignored. Finalists received three throws each, with the top eight competitors receiving an additional three attempts. The best distance among those six throws counted.

Records

Prior to this competition, the existing world and Olympic records were as follows.

No new world or Olympic records were set for this event. The following national records were set during the competition:

Schedule

All times are China standard time (UTC+8)

Results

Qualifying round

Qualification: 20.40 (Q) or at least 12 best performers (q) advance to the final.

Final

References

Athletics at the 2008 Summer Olympics
Shot put at the Olympics
Men's events at the 2008 Summer Olympics